Washington State Penitentiary (also called the Walla Walla State Penitentiary) is a Washington State Department of Corrections men's prison located in Walla Walla, Washington. With an operating capacity of 2,200, it is the second largest prison in the state (after Coyote Ridge Corrections Center) and is surrounded by wheat fields. It opened in 1886, three years before statehood.

It was the site of Washington State's death row and where executions were carried out, until the Washington Supreme Court ruled the state's death penalty statute unconstitutional on October 11, 2018, thereby abolishing capital punishment in the state. Methods for execution were lethal injection and hanging.

Located at 1313 N. 13th Avenue, it is commonly known as "the Walls" among inmates and "The Pen" to the locals. The penitentiary is sometimes known as "Concrete Mama", from a book with the same title by Ethan Hoffman and John McCoy. Elsewhere within Washington, and also to an extent in the surrounding states, the name Walla Walla is a metonym for the penitentiary. The penitentiary was the subject of the song "Walla Walla" by American punk rock band The Offspring.

History
Washington State Penitentiary is the oldest operational prison in Washington state and among the oldest operational prisons in the US.

During the 1880s, Washington's territorial legislature sought to build a state prison to satisfy a requirement for eventual statehood. The territory's prison at the time, the privately-owned Seatco Prison, had "poor living conditions" and was nicknamed "The Seatco Dungeon" and "Hell on Earth". Its inmates performed penal labor and manufactured goods while being denied visitation rights and access to clergy. Walla Walla's city government began lobbying for a territory-funded institution, and after Levi Ankeny, a local wealthy business man, donated 160-acres for the site in 1886, the legislators approved the Washington Territorial Prison. On May 11, 1887, the first 10 prisoners arrived from Seatco.

Guards were placed on the facility's walls after two prisoners escaped shortly after it was opened, on July 4, 1887. They only made it a few miles before being recaptured. There have been several more escapes since, including a seized supply train in 1891, a riot that left nine dead in 1934, 10 who tunneled under the wall in 1955, and John Allen Lamb, who sawed his way out in 1997.

In 1887, the facility had its first incarcerated woman, a housewife who had committed grand larceny, but there were no accommodations suitable for a woman. The prison later converted the hospital quarters to accommodate four women, and later built a separate facility. The remaining Seatco inmates were transferred in 1888, and the facility was shut down, and the town changed its name to "Bucoda". When Washington became a state in 1889, the facility officially became the Washington State Penitentiary, but inmates nicknamed it "The Hill", "The Joint", "The Walls", and "The Pen". The first execution was carried out in 1906, and the final in 2010 of Cal Coburn Brown. Capital punishment in Washington became illegal in 2018. The most notable inmate at Walla Walla is Gary Ridgway, a serial killer known as the "Green River killer," who pleaded guilty in 2003 to the murders of 48 women to avoid the death penalty. He was still incarcerated there as of November 2021.

Over a one-year period, starting in March 2002, more than one hundred inmates and staff at the Washington State Penitentiary were infected with Campylobacter jejuni. During this period, five clusters of the infection were identified, and genetic testing indicated that all of the bacteria were indistinguishable from each other. The source of this outbreak is not known, but contamination via pigeon feces, as well as unsafe food handling procedures, were examined.

In June 2021, dozens of inmates were subjected to extreme heat when the air conditioning stopped working in the solitary confinement unit.

Notable prisoners
 Allen Christopher Ivanov, convicted in the 2016 Mukilteo shooting
 Billy Gohl, union employee who murdered many sailors, Aberdeen
 Christopher Monfort was convicted in the October 31, 2009 murder of police officer Timothy Brenton. Monfort died at Walla Walla in January 2017.
 Conner Schierman, convicted murderer in the 2006 Kirkland murders
 Gabriel Gaeta, convicted in the August 2014 murder of six-year-old Jenise Wright
 Gary Ridgway, convicted serial killer in south King County, referred to in the news media as the "Green River Killer"
 Gerald Friend was a convicted serial rapist and kidnapper, whose crimes after his release served as the inspiration for Nirvana song "Polly."
 Henri Young, convicted bank robber and cause célèbre
 Jack Owen Spillman, American serial killer from Spokane, known as the "Werewolf Butcher"
 Joseph Kondro, convicted serial killer in the Longview murders of three girls, died at Walla Walla in May 2012
 Joseph McEnroe, convicted murderer in the 2007 Carnation murders
 Kenneth Bianchi, the Hillside Strangler.
 Kevin Coe, convicted rapist from Spokane, often referred to in the news media as the "South Hill Rapist"
 Linda Hazzard, doctor known for murdering patients through her detox methods, Olalla, Washington
 Little Willie John, an R&B singer who was sentenced to 8–20 years for manslaughter and died at Walla Walla on May 26, 1968
 Lyle Beerbohm, American professional mixed martial artist who spent over a year in Walla Walla for drug-related crimes
 Mitchell Rupe was convicted in the September 1981 murders of two bank tellers during a robbery at Tumwater State Bank in Olympia. Rupe died at Walla Walla in February 2006.
Richard Clark, convicted in the April 1995 murder of seven-year-old Roxanne Doll
 Robert Lee Yates, American serial killer from Spokane, had also worked at the prison before
 Ryan Alexander, convicted in the April 2002 murder of eight-year-old Michael "Mikey" Busby, Jr.
 Stanley Bernson, convicted murderer and self-proclaimed serial killer
 Terapon "Lee" Adhahn, convicted of rape of several children and rape/murder of a child in Tacoma, Washington
 William Earl Talbott II
 William Lembcke, convicted in the December 2000 Addy murders of his parents and siblings

Executed
Jake Bird, convicted double murderer and alleged serial killer, hanged on July 15, 1949
Harvey Collins, serial killer, hanged on December 3, 1957
Westley Allan Dodd, serial killer, hanged on January 5, 1993 upon his own request
Charles Rodman Campbell, convicted of a triple murder, hanged on May 27, 1994
Jeremy Vargas Sagastegui, convicted of a triple murder, executed by lethal injection on October 13, 1998
James Homer Elledge, convicted of murder, executed by lethal injection on August 28, 2001
Cal Coburn Brown, the last man executed in Washington State, executed by lethal injection on September 10, 2010

Organization
The penitentiary has five custody levels:
 Camp/Minimum: 1-4 Years
 Protective Custody & Mental Health: 1 Year- Life 
 Medium: 1 Year- Life
 Close: 1 Year- Life 
 Maximum/Segregation: 1 Year- Life

In Popular Culture
"Walla Walla" is the eighth song on The Offspring's 1998 album, Americana.  The song is an ode to a friend who, after countless times getting off with a "slap on the wrist", has been sentenced to serve "three to five" years at Walla Walla.
The prison was used for the filming of a scene in the Swedish movie Dancer in the Dark.

See also
List of law enforcement agencies in Washington (state)
List of United States state correction agencies
List of U.S. state prisons
List of Washington state prisons

References

Further reading

External links
Profile at Washington Department of Corrections website
 Washington State Penitentiary collection at the Whitman College and Northwest Archives, Whitman College.

1886 establishments in Washington Territory
Buildings and structures in Walla Walla County, Washington
Capital punishment in Washington (state)
Government buildings completed in 1887
Prisons in Washington (state)
Walla Walla, Washington
Execution sites in the United States